Callistoplax is a monotypic genus of chitons belonging to the family Callistoplacidae. The only species is Callistoplax retusa.

The species is found in North and Central America.

References

Chitons
Chiton genera
Monotypic mollusc genera